Shriek may refer to:

 Screaming, a loud vocalization
 Exclamation mark, in some computing and mathematical contexts
 Shriek map, in category theory, a type of unusual functor
 Shriek (album) or the title song, by Wye Oak, 2014
 "Shriek" (Batman Beyond), a television episode
 Shriek (Batman Beyond character), the namesake character introduced in the episode
 Shriek (character), a Marvel Comics character
 Shriek: An Afterword, a 2006 novel by Jeff VanderMeer
 Shriek, in the Dragon Age media franchise, a type of Darkspawn creature 
 Shriek DuBois, a character in the TV series CatDog
 The Shriek, a 1933 American animated short film

See also
 Shrieker (disambiguation)
 Shrek (disambiguation)